Stephanofilaria is a genus of nematode worms in the family Filariidae. They are known to cause chronic dermatitis in cattle.

References

Rhabditida
Rhabditida genera
Nematode genera
Taxa described in 1933